Alvito Nunes or Aloyto Núñez (died 1015) was an 11th-century Count of Portugal. Following the death of Menendo González in 1008, he governed the county jointly with Toda, count Menendo's widow.

Alvito Nunes was killed by Vikings during a bloody assault on Vermoim Castle, located around Vila Nova de Famalicão.

He is believed to be descended from the first family Portuguese counts, that of Vímara Peres, through one Nuno Alvites (or Aloytez), probable grandson of Lucídio Vimaranes. He was followed in the county by his son Nuno Alvites who died in 1028.

Marriage and issue 
He married Gontina with whom he had at least four children:
 Nuno Alvites (d. 1028) also known as Nuño Aloytez, married to Ilduara Mendes daughter of count Menendo González, who would rule in her own right after her husband's death. 
 Segeredo Alvites or Aloytez, husband of Adosinda Arias and father of Azenda Segerédez, wife of Diego Gutiérrez, parents of Ardio Díaz, whose daughter Urraca Fróilaz was the first wife of count Pedro Fróilaz de Traba. Segeredo and his brother Pedro accompanied King Ferdinand I of León in the reconquest of Coimbra in 1064.
 Pedro Alvites, documented between 1025 and 1070, abbot at Guimarães.
 Loba Alvites

Notes

References

Bibliography 
 
 
 
 

Portuguese nobility
1015 deaths
County of Portugal
10th-century births
11th-century counts of Portugal (Asturias-León)